Propycnadenoides is a genus of trematodes in the family Opecoelidae.

Species
Propycnadenoides naffari Al-Bassel, 2001
Propycnadenoides philippinensis Fischthal & Kuntz, 1964

References

Opecoelidae
Plagiorchiida genera